The men's 1500 metres event at the 2015 Summer Universiade was held on 8 and 10 July at the Gwangju Universiade Main Stadium.

Medalists

Results

Heats
Qualification: First 3 in each heat (Q) and next 3 fastest (q) qualified for the semifinals.

Final

References

1500